Madan is a town in Smolyan Province, the very south of Bulgaria in the Yellow Share of the Rhodope Mountains. It is the administrative centre of the homonymous Madan Municipality. In 2019, the town has a population of 6,597 inhabitants.

Geography

Madan is a part of Ardino Ridge, sloping down to the northeast between the rivers Arda and Varbitsa. In the central part of the Yellow Share rise the peaks Buchovitsa (1404 m), Veternitsa (1372 m) and Petrovitsa (1309 m).

The end of the ridge is Alada Peak (1241 m). From all sides the Yellow Share is separated by mountain-spurs, whose segmentations gradually slope down and vanish into the valleys of the rivers. The river system of the region is presented by the basins of the upper reaches of some of the longer rivers – to the north the basin of the Arda River with the headers Elhovska and Chepinska Rivers.

History and population
Madan is an ancient ore-miners' settlement, the extraction of lead ore having begun around 5th-4th century BC.

Most of the town's population consists of local Pomaks and a minority of Eastern Orthodox Bulgarians.

Honour
Madan Saddle on Smith Island, South Shetland Islands is named after Madan.

References

External links

 Official site of the Municipality of Madan
 Other site for the Municipality of Madan
 Pictures from Madan

Towns in Bulgaria
Cities and towns in the Rhodopes
Populated places in Smolyan Province